The 97th Deccan Infantry was an infantry regiment of the British Indian Army. They could trace their origin to 1794, when they were the 3rd Battalion of the Aurangabad Division in the Hyderabad State army. Which took part in the Battle of Seringapatam in the Fourth Anglo-Mysore War.

After the Kitchener reforms of the Indian Army all the Princely state forces were incorporated into the Indian Army in 1903. During World War I the regiment served in the 15th Indian Division during the Mesopotamia Campaign.

After World War I the Indian government again reformed the army, moving from single battalion regiments to multi battalion regiments. The 97th Deccan Infantry now became the 3rd Battalion, 19th Hyderabad Regiment. This was one of the regiments allocated to the new Indian Army on independence.

Previous names
3rd Battalion of the Aurangabad Division - 1794
4th Regiment of Infantry, Nizam's Army - 1826
4th Infantry, Hyderabad Contingent - 1854
97th Deccan Infantry - 1903

References

British Indian Army infantry regiments
Military units and formations established in 1794
Military units and formations disestablished in 1922
Military history of the Madras Presidency
Indian World War I regiments
1794 establishments in British India